is a Japanese decathlete. He competed at the 2012 Summer Olympics.

He competed for Japan at the 2016 Summer Olympics in the decathlon where he finished 20th. He was the flag bearer for Japan during the Parade of Nations.

Competition record

References

External links
 
 
 
 

1986 births
Living people
People from Ebetsu, Hokkaido
Sportspeople from Hokkaido
Japanese decathletes
Japanese male athletes
Olympic decathletes
Olympic athletes of Japan
Athletes (track and field) at the 2012 Summer Olympics
Athletes (track and field) at the 2016 Summer Olympics
Asian Games gold medalists for Japan
Asian Games gold medalists in athletics (track and field)
Athletes (track and field) at the 2010 Asian Games
Athletes (track and field) at the 2014 Asian Games
Athletes (track and field) at the 2018 Asian Games
Medalists at the 2014 Asian Games
Medalists at the 2018 Asian Games
World Athletics Championships athletes for Japan
Asian Athletics Championships winners
Japan Championships in Athletics winners
New Zealand Athletics Championships winners